11 Flowers is a 2011 film directed by Wang Xiaoshuai centered on a boy named Wang Han who loses his white shirt which shows that he is his school's best gymnast. The loss of the shirt is to take on greater metaphorical meaning as the film progresses which is inspired by the director's own experience as a youth during the cultural revolution and the more general confusion of childhood.

External links
'11 Flowers': A Revolutionary Childhood by Mark Jenkins (NPR)

2011 films
Films set in the 1970s
2010s coming-of-age drama films
Films directed by Wang Xiaoshuai
Chinese coming-of-age films
2011 drama films